Mount Pilchuck State Park is a public recreation area located  east of Granite Falls, Washington, on the western edges of the Cascade Mountains. The state park features  of alpine scenery, recreational activities, and Mount Pilchuck itself.

History
The name "Pilchuck" originated from the Native American name of "red water" for a creek in the area. The U.S. Forest Service built a fire lookout on the summit in 1918 which was staffed until the 1960s. Washington State Parks administered a concessionaire-run ski area on the slopes of Mt. Pilchuck from 1957 to 1980, when it was closed due to poor snow conditions. The park is managed in partnership with the USFS and the Everett Mountaineers.

References

External links

Mount Pilchuck State Park Washington State Parks and Recreation Commission 
Mount Pilchuck State Parks Map Washington State Parks and Recreation Commission
Mount Pilchuck Ski Resort Ski Map

State parks of Washington (state)
Parks in Snohomish County, Washington
Protected areas established in 1957